Mary Tyler Moore: The 20th Anniversary Show is a 1991 American television special to commemorate the 20th anniversary of the first broadcast of the sitcom The Mary Tyler Moore Show. It was directed by Jack Haley Jr. and was broadcast on CBS on February 18, 1991.

Summary
Mary Tyler Moore hosts a 20th anniversary retrospective of The Mary Tyler Moore Show featuring a compilation of clips from the show's memorable moments and a reunion with co-stars Ed Asner, Valerie Harper, Gavin MacLeod, Betty White, Georgia Engel and Cloris Leachman. The cast comments how the groundbreaking show was ahead of its time for having a thirtysomething, single female as its main character and how it revealed the changing consciousness of the 1970s.

Moore introduces clips highlighting each of the show's individual characters, after which cast members comment on their character's specific traits and quirks. The cast also pays tribute to the late Ted Knight (who died in 1986) for his portrayal of TV anchorman Ted Baxter.

The special concludes with the teary-eyed cast watching the final moments from the series finale, "The Last Show".

Cast
 Mary Tyler Moore (Host)
 Ed Asner (Guest)
 Valerie Harper (Guest)
 Gavin MacLeod (Guest)
 Betty White (Guest)
 Georgia Engel (Guest)
 Cloris Leachman (Guest)

Reception
Mary Tyler Moore: The 20th Anniversary Show was a huge Nielsen ratings winner for CBS, earning an 11th-place finish and receiving a 17.4 rating (16.2 million households) for the week of February 18, 1991.

See also
Mary and Rhoda
The Mary Tyler Moore Reunion
List of television reunion films

References

External links

The Mary Tyler Moore Show
1991 television specials
1990s American television specials
1990s in comedy
Television series reunion specials
CBS television specials
Television shows directed by Jack Haley Jr.
MTM Enterprises films